SV Seligenporten is a German association football club from Pyrbaum, Bavaria. It is part of a sportsclub established 23 July 1949 which also has departments for handball, Ju-Jitsu, horseback riding, dancing, singing, and women's recreational sport.

History
The footballers first rose above amateur level in Middle Franconia when they earned promotion to the Landesliga Bayern-Mitte (V) in 2004. The enjoyed a successful 2006–07 campaign that saw them beat FC Augsburg II 3–0 on their way to a 1–0 win over Würzburger FV in the final of the Bavarian Cup. This earned the club an appearance in the opening round of the DFB-Pokal (German Cup) where they were eliminated 0–2 by Bundesliga side Arminia Bielefeld.

In the 2007–08 season, a second place in the Landesliga allowed the club to move up to the Oberliga Bayern. Like with their promotion in 2004, they finished runners-up to the FSV Erlangen-Bruck.

SVS experienced a difficult 2008–09 season and had to continue its fight for Bayernliga survival in the post-season, having finished on equal points with Würzburger FV (14th) and TSV Rain am Lech (16th) and therefore requiring a set of deciders to be played. After losing to Rain 5–1 and beating Würzburg 4–0, the team had to face FC Affing in the promotion/relegation round. A 3–0 victory over Affing put the club into the final, where it faced SpVgg Landshut and won 1–0, retaining its Bayernliga status.

At the end of the 2011–12 season the club managed to finish in the top nine of the Bayernliga and thereby directly qualified for the new tier four Regionalliga Bayern, where it since plays.

After three seasons in the league with a seventh place in 2014 as its best result the club finished seventeenth in 2014–15 and was relegated from the league but won the Bayernliga Nord in 2015–16 and made a direct return to the Regionalligam where it played until relegation in 2018.

Honors
The club's honours:

League
 Bayernliga Nord (V)
 Champions: 2016
 Landesliga Bayern-Mitte (V)
 Runners-up: 2008
 Bezirksoberliga Mittelfranken (VI)
 Runners-up: 2004
 Bezirksliga Mittelfranken-Süd (VII)
 Champions: 2001

Cup
 Bavarian Cup
 Winners: 2007
 Mittelfranken Cup
 Winners: 2007

Recent seasons
The recent season-by-season performance of the club:

With the introduction of the Bezirksoberligas in 1988 as the new fifth tier, below the Landesligas, all leagues below dropped one tier. With the introduction of the Regionalligas in 1994 and the 3. Liga in 2008 as the new third tier, below the 2. Bundesliga, all leagues below dropped one tier. With the establishment of the Regionalliga Bayern as the new fourth tier in Bavaria in 2012 the Bayernliga was split into a northern and a southern division, the number of Landesligas expanded from three to five and the Bezirksoberligas abolished. All leagues from the Bezirksligas onward were elevated one tier.

Recent managers
Recent managers of the club:

DFB Cup appearances
The club has qualified for the first round of the German Cup just once:

Source:

References

External links
Official team site

Football clubs in Germany
Neumarkt (district)
Football clubs in Bavaria
Association football clubs established in 1949
Football in Upper Palatinate
1949 establishments in West Germany